This article outlines the grammar of the Dutch language, which shares strong similarities with German grammar and also, to a lesser degree, with English grammar.

Preliminary considerations

Vowel length is indicated in Dutch spelling using a combination of double vowels and double consonants. Changes from single to double letters are common when discussing Dutch grammar, but they are entirely predictable once one knows how the spelling rules work. This means that the spelling alternations do not form part of the grammar, and they are not discussed here. For more information, see Dutch orthography.

Word order

Dutch word order is underlyingly SOV (subject–object–verb). There is an additional rule called V2 in main clauses, which moves the finite (inflected for subject) verb into the second position in the sentence. Because of this, sentences with only one verb appear with SVO (subject–verb–object) or VSO (verb–subject–object) order.

{| style="font-style:italic"
| Jan||hielp||zijn moeder
|- style="font-style:normal"
|Jan||helped||his mother
|-
| colspan=9 style="font-style:normal" | "Jan helped his mother."
|}

{| style="font-style:italic"
| Gisteren||hielp||Jan||zijn moeder
|- style="font-style:normal"
| Yesterday||helped||Jan||his mother
|-
| colspan=9 style="font-style:normal" | "Yesterday, Jan helped his mother."
|}

However, any other verbs or verbal particles are placed at the end of the clause in accordance with the underlying SOV order, giving an intermediate order of SVOV(V)(V)...

{| style="font-style:italic"
| Jan||wilde||zijn moeder||gaan helpen
|- style="font-style:normal"
|Jan||wanted||his mother||to go help
|-
| colspan=9 style="font-style:normal" | "Jan wanted to go help his mother."
|}

In subordinate clauses, the order is exclusively SOV. In subordinate clauses two word orders are possible for the verb clusters and are referred to as the "red": , "because I have worked": like in English, where the auxiliary verb precedes the past participle, and the "green": , where the past participle precedes the auxiliary verb, "because I worked have": like in German. In Dutch, the green word order is most used in speech, and the red is the most used in writing, particularly in journalistic texts, but the "green" is also used in writing. Unlike in English, however, adjectives and adverbs must precede the verb: , "that the book is green". For an explanation of verb clusters of three or more see: V2 word order

{| style="font-style:italic"
| Jan||zei||dat||hij||zijn moeder||wilde||gaan helpen
|- style="font-style:normal"
|Jan||said||that||he||his mother||wanted||to go help
|-
| colspan=9 style="font-style:normal" | "Jan said that he wanted to go help his mother."
|}

In yes–no questions, the verb of the main clause is usually, but not always, placed first instead of second. If the verb comes second, this often implies disbelief, like in English: "The prisoner escaped?" vs. "Did the prisoner escape?"

{| style="font-style:italic"
|Hielp||Jan||zijn moeder?
|- style="font-style:normal"
|Helped||Jan||his mother?
|-
| colspan=5 style="font-style:normal" | "Did Jan help his mother?"
|}

{| style="font-style:italic"
|Wilde||Jan||zijn moeder||gaan helpen?
|- style="font-style:normal"
|Wanted||Jan||his mother||to go help?
|-
| colspan=5 style="font-style:normal" | "Did Jan want to go help his mother?"
|}

{| style="font-style:italic"
| Zei||Jan||dat||hij||zijn moeder||wilde||gaan helpen?
|- style="font-style:normal"
| Said||Jan||that||he||his mother||wanted||to go help?
|-
| colspan=9 style="font-style:normal" | "Did Jan say that he wanted to go help his mother?"
|}

In imperative sentences, the verb of the main clause is always placed first, although it may be preceded by a noun phrase indicating who is being addressed.

{| style="font-style:italic"
|(Jan,)||ga||je moeder||helpen!
|- style="font-style:normal"
|(Jan,)||go||your mother||help!
|-
| colspan=5 style="font-style:normal" | "(Jan,) go help your mother!"
|}

{| style="font-style:italic"
| (Jan,)||zeg||dat||je||je moeder||wilde||gaan helpen!
|- style="font-style:normal"
| (Jan,)||say||that||you||your mother||wanted||to go help!
|-
| colspan=9 style="font-style:normal" | "(Jan,) say that you wanted to go help your mother!"
|}

In the following example, the SOV order in the subordinate clause causes the various noun phrases to be separated from the verbs that introduce them, creating a relatively deep "nesting" structure:

{| style="font-style:italic"
|Ik zie dat || de ouders || de kinderen || Jan || het huis || hebben || laten || helpen || schilderen.
|- style="font-style:normal"
|I see that || the parents || the children || Jan || the house || have || let || help || paint
|-
| colspan=9 style="font-style:normal" | "I see that the parents have let the children help Jan paint the house."
|}

Adjectives always come before the noun to which they belong.
 – red apples

In contrast to English, adpositional phrase come in the order time–manner–place, so that time modifiers usually come before place modifiers:

{| style="font-style:italic"
|Ik|| ben ||dit ||jaar ||naar ||Frankrijk ||geweest
|- style="font-style:normal"
|I|| am ||this ||year ||to ||France ||been
|-
| colspan="7" style="font-style:normal" | "I have been to France this year."
|}

Nouns

In Dutch, nouns are marked for number in singular and plural. Cases have largely fallen out of use, as have the endings that were used for them. Standard Dutch has three genders: masculine, feminine and neuter. However, in large parts of the Netherlands there is no grammatical distinction between what were originally masculine and feminine genders, and there is only a distinction between common and neuter. Gender is not overtly marked on nouns either, and must be learned for each noun.

Plural

Which of the two is used is somewhat unpredictable, although some general rules can be given:

 Single-syllable words, which are common in Dutch, normally use :
  "door" → 
  "boat" → 
  "house" → 
  "thief" → 
 Words ending in a schwa  often use , but a sizable number use , particularly if they are older. Some nouns may allow either ending. Nouns that are substantivised forms of adjectives always use .
  "aunt" → 
  "chocolate" → 
  "messenger" →  or 
  "oxide" → 
  "great one" → 
  "baby" → 
  "café, bar, pub" → 
  "pizza" → 
  "radio" → 
  "roe" → 
  (also ) "drawer" →  (but in colloquial usage sometimes also )
 Words ending in unstressed  or  usually use . If  is allowed it tends to be more archaic or poetic.
  "agricultural field" → 
  "apple" →  or (archaic)  (note: for the derived noun  "potato", the plural  is still common, alongside )
  "spoon" → 
  "key" → 
  "father" →  or (archaic) 
 Initialisms (words pronounced as letters) follow the rules for whatever the final syllable suggests, usually by adding  but occasionally :
  "vehicle inspection" → 
  "CD" →

Plurals with vowel change

A number of common nouns inherited from Old Dutch have a short vowel in the singular but a long vowel in the plural. When short  is lengthened in this way, it becomes long .

   "day" →   "days"
   "lack, deficiency" →   "deficiencies"
   "ship" →   "ships"
   "lock" →   "locks" (also the plural of  "ditch")

Other nouns with this change include:  "bath",  "(money) contribution",  "command",  "sheet of paper; magazine" (not "leaf"),  "offer",  "roof",  "valley",  "hole",  "prayer",  "commandment",  "gene",  "glass",  "god",  "duke",  "court",  "cave; burrow",  "member",  "lottery ticket",  "war",  "path",  "shot",  "strike, battle",  "smith",  "large game; spectacle" (not in the sense of a smaller everyday game),  "staff",  "vat, barrel",  "ban, prohibition",  "treaty",  "permission",  "road, way".

The noun   "town, city" has umlaut in the plural alongside lengthening:   "towns, cities". The plural of nouns ending in the suffix   "-ness, -hood" is irregular  .

Plurals in 

This ending derives from the old Germanic "z-stem" nouns, and is cognate with the English  (etc.). The following nouns have this type of plural:
  "bone" →  (when used in the sense "leg", the plural is the regular )
  "leaf" →  (when used in the sense "sheet, magazine", the plural is )
  "egg" → 
  "rank, file" → 
  "mood, emotion" → 
  "good" → 
  "fowl" → 
  "calf" → 
  "child" → 
  "cloth" → (archaic)  or  "clothes" (nowadays a plurale tantum like in English)
  "lamb" → 
  "song" →  (somewhat dated; the plural of the diminutive is often used instead)
  "wheel" → 
  "cattle" → 
  "people, nation" →  (the regular  is also used)

For example:  "eggshell",  "child labour",  "traditional costume",  "beef tartare". This is not a rule, however, and compounds with the singular form also exist:  "egg-shape",  "beef".

Foreign plurals

For a number of nouns of Latin origin, a Latin-like plural may be used.

  "museum" →  or 
  "politician" → 

Some modern scientific words borrowed from Latin or Greek form their plurals with vowel lengthening, like the native words listed above. Alongside the change in vowel length, there is also a stress shift in the plural, patterned on the Latin third declension where this also occurs. Some examples:

  ( "electron") →  ( "electrons")
  ( "doctor (holder of a doctorate)") →  ( "doctors")
  ( "graviton") →  ( "gravitons")
  ( "reactor") →  ( "reactors")

This applies especially to recent borrowings.

  → 
  →

Diminutive

Many nouns have a diminutive form alongside the normal base form. This form is used to indicate small size, or emphasize a particular endearing quality. Use of diminutives is very common, so much that they could be considered part of the noun's inflectional paradigm.

The former is the standard way, while the latter is found in some dialects, mostly in the south (Brabantian and Limburgish). All diminutives have neuter gender, no matter what the gender of the original noun was.

Diminutive in 

The basic suffix  is modified in different ways depending on the final sounds of the noun it is attached to.

The  is removed from the ending when added to words ending in a fricative or plosive (-b, -c, -d, -f, -g, -ch, -k, -p, -q, -s, -sj, -t, -v, -x, -z).

 hond → hondje
 brief → briefje
 hok → hokje
 vis → visje
 douche → doucheje ( → )
 race → raceje ( →  ~ )

Note that the last two words really end in a consonant, despite not being spelled that way.

When the vowel of the last syllable is both short and stressed, and it is followed by a sonorant, an extra schwa  is inserted, giving .
 kom → kommetje
 pil → pilletje
 lam → lammetje
 ding → dingetje
 vriendin → vriendinnetje
 baron → baronnetje

In all other cases, the basic form  is used. This includes:
 Words ending in a stressed tense/long vowel or diphthong.
 Words ending in any unstressed vowel.

When the final vowel is long, it is doubled accordingly. Final , which does not really occur in native Dutch words, is converted into . Final  gets an apostrophe.

 koe → koetje
 auto → autootje
 mama → mamaatje
 vrouw → vrouwtje
 taxi → taxietje
 baby → baby'tje
 school → schooltje
 kuil → kuiltje
 maan → maantje
 muur → muurtje
 appel → appeltje
 boom → boompje
 duim → duimpje
 bodem → bodempje
 koning → koninkje
 houding → houdinkje

While pronounced short in many dialects, they can also be long for some speakers, so forms both with and without the extra  can be found.
 bloem → bloemetje or bloempje (however  has an additional meaning)
 wiel → wieltje or wieletje

Diminutive in 

In the south, the ending  is often used instead. It also has different forms depending on the preceding sounds, with rules very similar to those for the  ending.

This form is not used much today, due to final n-deletion which is common in Dutch, but it is still found in older texts and names.

When the word ends in a velar consonant (-g, -ch, -k, -ng), an extra dissimilative  is inserted, giving .
 dag → dagske
 lach → lachske
 stok → stokske
 ding → dingske
 koning → koningske

An extra  is inserted in three cases, giving :
 Words ending in a non-velar plosive (-p, -b, -t, -d).

Examples:

 hond → hondeke
 voet → voeteke
 map → mappeke
 boon → boneke
 bon → bonneke
 kom → kommeke
 hol → holleke
 bar → barreke

In all other cases, the ending is the basic . This includes:
 Words ending in a vowel.
 Words ending in a non-velar fricative (-f, -v, -s, -z).

Examples:

 mama → mamake
 koe → koeke
 slof → slofke
 doos → dooske
 school → schoolke
 muur → muurke
 boom → boomke
 bodem → bodemke

Umlaut in diminutives

Standard Dutch, as well as most dialects, do not use umlaut as a grammatical marker. However, some eastern dialects (East Brabantian, Limburgish and many Low Saxon areas) have regular umlaut of the preceding vowel in diminutives. As this is not a standard feature, it is rare in the written language except when used to evoke a local feeling. It can be more common in the spoken language. Some examples:

  → 
  → 
  →

Diminutives of nouns with irregular plurals

Nouns with irregular plurals tend to have the same irregularity in the diminutive as well. This is not a rule, however, and both forms can often be found. For some nouns, the irregularity is more common in the plural of the diminutive, and only rarely appears in the singular. Some examples:

  "leaf; sheet of paper" →  "small leaf; folio", in plural also 
  "day" →  "short day", in plural also 
  "drinking glass" →  "small glass"
  "child" →  "toddler", in plural also 
  "path" →  "narrow or short path" (vs.  "toad" →  "toadlet")
  "wheel" →  or  "little wheel"
  "ship" →  "little ship"
  "game" →  "toy"
  "barrel" →  "small barrel"

Cases

Noun cases were still prescribed in the formal written standard up until the 1940s, but were abolished then because they had long disappeared from the spoken language. Because of this, they are nowadays restricted mostly to set phrases and are archaic. The former Dutch case system resembled that of modern German, and distinguished four cases: nominative (subject), genitive (possession or relation), dative (indirect object, object of preposition) and accusative (direct object, object of preposition). Only the nominative and genitive are productive, with the genitive seldom used and only surviving in the margins of the language. Some examples of the three non-nominative cases in fixed expressions:

 Genitive:  "judgement day",  "Kingdom of the Nederlands"
 Dative:  "in fact",  "nowadays",  "hereby"
 Accusative:  "eventually",  "good evening"

The role of cases has been taken over by prepositions and word order in modern Dutch. For example, the distinction between direct and indirect object is now made by placing the indirect object before the direct object, or by using the preposition aan "to" with the indirect object. The genitive is replaced with the preposition van "of". Usage of cases with prepositions has disappeared as well. Nowadays, the case of each noun is interpreted mainly by word order. Nominatives go first, datives after, and lastly the accusatives. Nouns after prepositions are also accusative.

Cases are still occasionally used productively, which are often calques of existing phrases. This is particularly true of the genitive case, which is still used occasionally to evoke a formal style. Speakers' awareness of how the cases were originally used is generally low. People may confuse the old masculine/neuter genitive article  and the corresponding noun ending  with the article  (with no ending) used for feminine or plural nouns.

Articles

Dutch has both a definite article ("the") and an indefinite article ("a" or "an").

They may sometimes also be contracted in spelling to reflect this: , .

There is no indefinite article in the plural, the noun is just used on its own. However, there is a negative indefinite article  ("no, not a, not any"). Similarly to  it is invariable, showing no inflection for gender or number.

  ("That is not a man")
  ("That is not a woman")
  ("That is not a house")
  ("Those aren't men")
  ("I have no water", "I don't have any water")

The articles formerly had forms for the different cases as well. See Archaic Dutch declension for more information.

Adjectives and adverbs

Within the Dutch noun phrase, adjectives are placed in front of the noun and after the article (if present).

Inflection

The inflection of adjectives follows the gender and number of the following noun. They also inflect for definiteness, like in many other Germanic languages. When preceded by a definite article, demonstrative determiner, possessive determiner or any other kind of word that acts to distinguish one particular thing from another, the definite form of the adjective is used. In other cases, such as with an indefinite article, indefinite determiner (like  "many" or  "all"), the indefinite form is used.

Despite the many different aspects that determine the inflection of an adjective, the adjective only occurs in two main forms. The uninflected form or base form is the adjective without any endings. The inflected form has the ending . The inflection of adjectives is as follows:

Adjectives are only inflected in this way when they are in an attributive role, where they precede a noun and modify it. Adjectives in a predicative role, which are used in predicative sentences with a copula verb, are not inflected and always use the uninflected form. Compare:

  ("the small man") —  ("the man is small")
  ("small houses") —  ("houses are small")

Most adjectives ending in  have no inflected form. This includes adjectives for materials, as well as the past participles of strong verbs.

  ("the wooden chair")
  ("the brick house")
  ("the broken lamps")

Adjectives that end in a vowel in their uninflected form are rare, and there are no fixed rules for them. Often, the uninflected and inflected forms are the same, but sometimes an extra  is added on anyway.

Additional uses of the uninflected form

Uninflected adjectives are occasionally found in other contexts. With neuter nouns, if the adjective is inherently part of the noun as part of a set phrase, then the uninflected form is often used in the definite singular as well:

  ("the public transport", as a specific entity)
  ("the public transport", meaning the transport that is public, it could be any transport)
  ("the big dictionary of the Dutch language", as a proper title)
  ("the big dictionary of the Dutch language", a dictionary that happens to be big)
  ("the civil code", as a proper name)

Indefinite adjectives describing people often remain uninflected, if they express a personal quality. This is not stylistically neutral, but has a formal, rhetorical or poetic ring to it, and can occasionally distinguish literal meanings of an adjective from a more figurative one. Furthermore, this is only done with some nouns, not all.

  ("a talented writer") —  (the same)
  ("a great man"; figurative meaning) —  ("a big/tall man"; literal meaning) —  ("a great/big/tall woman";  is always used with )

Partitive

Adjectives have a special form called the partitive that is used after an indefinite pronoun such as  ‘something’,  ‘nothing’,  ‘much, a lot’,  ‘little, a few’. The partitive form takes the ending .

  ("Tell me something interesting.")
  ("I've got to meet somebody new.")

  ("I've put on something purple.") (the base form is already )
  ("There isn't much fantastic about it.")

The few adjectives that end in a long vowel take instead  with an apostrophe like certain noun plurals.

  ("I didn't like purple so much, so now I have something lilac.")

Adjectives used as adverbs

The uninflected form of an adjective is implicitly also an adverb. This makes it hard at times to distinguish adjectives and adverbs in Dutch.

  ("That is a fast car. The car drives fast.")
  ("We were kindly welcomed by those kind people.")

Adjectives used as nouns

The inflected form of an adjective can also be used as a noun. Three types can be distinguished:

 The noun that the adjective refers to is omitted but implied. The adjective will then be inflected as if the noun had been present, although the inflected form is normally used even in the indefinite neuter singular.
  ("You can buy this car in various colours. Do you want the green, the blue or the yellow one?")
  ("We have three children, two big ones and a small one.", alternatively )
 The adjective is used as a masculine/feminine noun in its own right, usually referring to a person.
  ("You drive like a blind person!")
  ("Where are you, my loved one?")
  ("Release the prisoner!", from the past participle  "captured, imprisoned")
  ("The rich should help the poor.")
 The adjective is used as a neuter mass noun describing a concept.
  ("I can't answer, because I don't understand what was asked.")
  ("Fear of the unknown is very normal.")

Comparative and superlative

Adjectives have three degrees of comparison: positive, comparative, and superlative. The comparative and superlative are formed synthetically, by adding endings to the adjective. The comparative and superlative can also be formed analytically by using  "more" and  "most", but this is much rarer than in English. The analytic forms are used only when the word would become particularly long, or when it would become hard to pronounce (particularly in the superlative).

The comparative is formed by adding  to the base form. The comparative inflects as an adjective in its own right, having inflected and partitive forms. The uninflected comparative can be used as an adverb as well.

  ("I'm big, but you're bigger.")
  ("This toy can be dangerous for smaller children.")
  ("This coat is more expensive.")
  ("Do you have nothing cheaper?")
  ("You did it even more fantastically than last time!")

The superlative is formed by adding . This is equivalent to adding  to the partitive, and the same rules apply.

  ("Mont Blanc is the highest mountain of the Alps.")
  ("This is the dirtiest toilet I've ever seen.", alternatively )

Because it is most often used to distinguish one particular thing from all others, the superlative is generally accompanied by a definite article. This means it is rarely found in the uninflected form. Even in predicative sentences, a definite article precedes, so it becomes more like a noun phrase with an implied noun.

  ("This coat is the most expensive.")
  ("This house is the biggest.")

When used as an adverb, the superlative is always preceded by the neuter article , unlike in English where this is optional. Either the uninflected or the inflected form can be used, without any difference in meaning. This form can also be used as part of predicative sentences, which can lead to a mismatch of genders which may seem odd at first glance, but is correct nonetheless:

  ("This coat is (the) most expensive")
  ("This house is (the) biggest.")
  ("Our car drives (the) fastest of all.")

Note that the first sentence meaning "This coat is the most expensive" has the same meaning as the first sentence further above. They are interchangeable, but they would be parsed differently. With the article , there is an implied noun, and it might better be translated as "the most expensive one". The superlative must also be in the inflected form in this case,  would be incorrect. With the article , there is no implied noun, and both the inflected and uninflected form can be used.

Some comparatives and superlatives are suppletive, and use a different root than the base form. These are irregular.

  ‘good/well, better, best’
  ‘much/many, more, most’
  ‘little/few, less/fewer, least/fewest’
  ‘willingly/gladly, rather/more preferably, most preferably’
  ‘often, more often, most often’

When an adjective is a compound of an adverb and a verb participle, the adverb sometimes changes rather than the whole word. A space may be added as well.

  ‘close/nearby, closer, closest’
  ‘densely populated, more densely populated, most densely populated’

Pronouns and determiners

Personal pronouns
As in English, Dutch personal pronouns still retain a distinction in case: the nominative (subjective), genitive (≈ possessive) and accusative/dative (objective). A distinction was once prescribed between the accusative 3rd person plural pronoun   and the dative , but it was artificial and both forms are in practice variants of the same word. These two cases are still sometimes taught to students, and may be used in formal Dutch, but no distinction is made in the everyday spoken language.

Like many other European languages, Dutch has a T-V distinction in its personal pronouns. The second-person pronouns, which are used to refer to the listener, exist in informal and formal varieties. However, because of the relatively complex and dialect-specific way in which the pronouns developed, this is less straightforward than it is in for example French or German. The old Germanic/Indo-European second-person singular pronoun  /  (English ) fell out of use in Dutch during the Middle Ages, while it remained in use in the closely related Limburgish and in neighboring Low German, West Frisian and German languages. The role of the old singular pronoun was taken over by the old plural form, which differed slightly depending on dialect:  in the South,  in the North. This development also happened in English, which once had a T-V distinction but then lost it when the old informal pronoun  was lost. In Dutch, however, further changes occurred, and the North and South developed differently:

 In the North and in the standard language, a new formal pronoun  was introduced, which made  distinctly informal. A new second-person plural pronoun was created by adding  "people" to the old singular (compare English ). This created , an informal pronoun when speaking to many people. The formal pronoun  is used for both singular and plural.
However, informal  and formal  are commonly used in the standard language of the South, like in the North.
These forms are not part of standard Dutch.

Many pronouns can occur in a stressed form and an unstressed (clitic) form. The stressed form retains the original full vowel, and is used when particular emphasis or contrast is needed. The unstressed form normally replaces the vowel with a schwa  and is used in other cases. The unstressed forms are shown in brackets; those spelled with an apostrophe or hyphen are not used often in formal written text, and are used mainly in informal speech.

It is formal and normal to replace these personal pronouns with demonstrative pronouns.

  (He/she likes milk.)
  (It is very fast.)

The pronouns are the only place in the standard language where the difference between masculine and feminine gender is significant. Consequently, the usage of the pronouns differs depending on how many genders are distinguished by a speaker. Speakers in the North will use feminine pronouns for female people, and the masculine pronouns for male people and for common-gender (masculine or feminine) nouns. In the South, the feminine pronouns are used for feminine nouns and the masculine pronouns are used for masculine nouns. See Gender in Dutch grammar for more details.

This distinction was artificially introduced in the 17th century, and is largely ignored in spoken language and not well understood by Dutch speakers. The shared unstressed form  is also often used as both direct and indirect objects and is a useful avoidance strategy when people are unsure which form to use.

In the West and among younger speakers, in informal spoken language,  is also used as a subject pronoun by some. This is considered heavily stigmatised and substandard.

Possessive determiners

Possessive determiners also have stressed and unstressed forms, like the pronouns.

Possessive determiners are not inflected when used attributively, unlike adjectives. Thus:

  ("He is my husband.")
  ("That is my house.")

Possessive determiners are themselves definite in meaning, so any following adjectives will occur in the definite form even when the possessive itself does not:

  ("our big house")
  ("our big houses").

The inflected form is also used when the determiner is used predicatively. It is always preceded by a definite article in this case, giving the appearance of an implied noun. For example:  ("This is my car. The car is mine.", more literally "The car is the my one").  has no inflected form, the sentence is usually rephrased with  instead:  ("The car is of you.")

Before the case system was abolished from written Dutch, and in southern spoken language, all possessive determiners inflect(ed) as indefinite adjectives, not only . They also used to inflect for case. While this is no longer done in modern Dutch, some relics still remain in fixed expressions. See Archaic Dutch declension for more details.

Demonstrative determiners
Like English, Dutch has two sets of demonstrative for different degrees of distance. A third, unspecific degree also exists, which is fulfilled by the personal pronouns, but see further below on pronominal adverbs.

The demonstratives inflect like indefinite adjectives, but irregularly. They are themselves definite in meaning, so any following adjectives will occur in the definite form.

  ("This is my new car. I bought this one yesterday.")
Even though  is of common gender and otherwise requires the form .

The exophoric pronoun, when used in a predicative sentence, is always the complement and never the subject. The inflection of the verb follows the other argument instead, and will be plural even when the pronoun is not:
  ("That is a new house")
  ("This is my father")
  ("Those are new houses", notice singular , with plural verb  agreeing with plural noun )
  ("These are my children", same with )

Pronominal adverbs

A pronominal adverb is a location adverb that corresponds in meaning to a pronoun, and takes its place.

Pronominal adverbs are used to replace the combination of prepositions with pronouns. They are very common in Dutch, and in some cases mandatory. The following table shows the pronouns that have adverbial forms:

Both the combination of preposition+pronoun and the pronominal adverb can often be used, although the adverbial form is more common. The pronoun is used mainly when one needs to be specific about it. The neuter pronoun  can never appear as the object of a preposition; the adverbial form is mandatory. Combinations of a preposition and a relative pronoun are also usually replaced by a pronominal adverb. E.g.
The masculine and feminine pronouns are used more often in the pronoun form, particularly when referring to persons, but the adverbial form may be used occasionally as well.

Pronominal adverbs are formed by replacing the pronoun by its corresponding locative adverb and the preposition by its adverbial form and putting them in reverse order. For example:

  ("I'm counting on your support.")
  ("I'm counting on it.")
  ("I'm counting on nothing.", more freely "I'm not counting on anything.")

  "with" → 
  ("He agrees with all proposals.")
  ("He agrees with it.")
  ("He agrees with everything.")
  "(up) to" → 
  ("I can't bring myself to (commit) these atrocities.")
  ("I can't bring myself to this.")

Conversely, there are a number of prepositional adverbs like  or  that cannot be used as prepositions, but they occur regularly as part of a pronominal adverb or of a separable verb.

The adverbial pronoun and the prepositional adverb can be separated from each other, with the prepositional part placed at the end of the clause. This is not always required, however, and some situations allow them to remain together.

  ("That, I am counting on."), they can be combined too:  or 
  ("I am not counting on it."), here they must be separated.

Notice that in Dutch the last word  is generally analyzed as an adverb, not a preposition. Thus, the often quoted 'rule' that a sentence should not end in a preposition is strictly adhered to.

Verbs

Dutch verbs inflect for person and number, and for two tenses and three moods. However, there is considerable syncretism among the forms. In modern usage only the present singular indicative has different forms for different persons, all other number, tense and mood combinations have just one form for all persons.

Dutch verbs inflect in these two main tenses:
 The present tense is used to indicate present or future time, and may therefore be considered a "non-past" tense. It can express actions that are punctual, progressive or habitual.
 The past tense is used to indicate past time. The actions can be progressive or habitual at the time being discussed, as well as punctual in a sequence of retold events. It is not used to indicate completed punctual events that have relevance for the present; instead the (periphrastic) present perfect is used in this role. Contrast Dutch  with English  — the time being discussed is past, but it is considered relevant in the present moment.

Verbs also inflect for the following moods:
 The indicative mood is the default mood of Dutch and is used for general statements.
 The subjunctive mood is used for statements that are perceived as hypothetical or desired. Due to syncretism it is only clearly distinguished from the indicative in the present singular. It is only slightly productive in modern Dutch, and is mainly restricted to formulaic phrases otherwise, such as  "long live the king" or  "may they rest in peace". Usually, it is replaced by the indicative or by a periphrastic conditional phrase.
 The imperative mood is used for commands. It exists only for the second person; imperatives for other persons are expressed periphrastically ( "let's..."). Only one form is used for both the singular and plural imperative in modern Dutch. The older separate plural imperative form has fallen out of use and is now archaic or overly formal in tone.

Other grammatical categories such as future tense, passive voice, progressive or perfect aspect may be expressed periphrastically. Verbs additionally have an infinitive and two participles (present and past).

Conjugation

Dutch conjugation resembles that of other continental West Germanic languages such as (Standard) German and Low German, and also the other Germanic languages to a lesser degree. Dutch retains the two main types of verb inherited from Proto-Germanic: weak and strong. Preterite-present verbs are also present, but can be considered irregular. All regular verbs conjugate the same in the present tense (including the infinitive and present participle), so the weak versus strong distinction only matters for the past tense.

The following is a general overview of the endings:

Weak verbs are the most common type of verb in Dutch, and the only productive type (all newly created verbs are weak). Which of the two is used depends on the final consonant of the verb stem. If the stem ends in a voiceless consonant, then  is used, otherwise .

  ("to work, worked")
  ("to learn/teach, learned/taught")
  ("to rage, raged")
  ("to lose/get rid of, lost")

Strong verbs are less common in Dutch, but they include many of the most common verbs. They form their past tenses by changing the vowel of the stem (ablaut). For strong verbs one needs to learn three or four principal parts: the infinitive, the past (singular), optionally the past plural, and the past participle. However, the vowel patterns are often predictable and can be divided into seven or so classes, based on the vowels used in these three principal parts. Some verbs are a mixture of two classes.

Examples:

  ("ride, rode, ridden", class 1)
  ("bind, bound, bound", class 3a)
  ("give, gave, given", class 5)
  ("walk/run, walked, walked", class 7b)

A number of verbs mix the strong and weak types of past. They have a strong past participle but all the other past tense forms are weak, or the other way around.

  ("laugh, laughed, laughed", weak past, strong past participle)
  ("salt, salted, salted", weak past, strong past participle)
  ("ask, asked, asked", strong past, weak past participle)

Some of the most used verbs in the Dutch language have irregular conjugations which don't follow the normal rules. This includes especially the preterite-present verbs. Preterite-present verbs have weak past tenses, but often irregularly formed. Many of these verbs are now used as auxiliary verbs.

The additional  of the second-person -form is optional in the past tense for weak verbs and is usually considered archaic. For strong verbs, the -t is always required.

Modal Verbs

These verbs act special and can provide the usage of infinitives. Modal verbs are also some of the few verbs which have irregular conjugation in the present tense.

A special feature of Dutch modal verbs not present in English is that speakers tend to omit the infinitive verb  ("go"),  ("come"), and similar verbs when a modal verb is finite and there is a preposition.

  ("I do not want to go to school.")
  ("He wants to come by car.")

Non-finite forms

Dutch possesses present and past participles.

Present participle

The present participle is always progressive in meaning, and indicates that something is performing the action as the subject. It is usually used as an attributive adjective, and inflects as such as well.

  ("I saw a falling star.")
  ("Barking dogs don't bite.")
  ("The news spreads like wildfire." — literally "like a running fire")

It can also be used as an adverb, meaning "while ...ing". Either the uninflected or inflected form can be used, although the uninflected form is more common outside set phrases.

  ("One learns while doing.")
  ("This work is so easy, I'm getting rich while sleeping.")
  ("Crying, the boy told what had happened that day.")

This is usually associated with a stilted or overly formal style. It is more usual to use  plus the infinitive.

The present participle of a transitive verb can be preceded by an object or an adverb. Often, the space between the two words is replaced with a hyphen or removed altogether, creating a compound adjective.
  ("I was stuck in slow-moving traffic.")
  ("The little dog let out a heart-rending cry.")
  ("Rock-throwing youths are an increasingly severe problem.")

Past participle

The past participle indicates completed actions. It is also used to form the perfect and the passive voice with a variety of auxiliary verbs. The formation of these is discussed in the section "periphrastic forms".

As an adjective, the meaning of the past participle can be either active (having performed the action) or passive (having undergone the action), depending on the type of verb:

 For transitive verbs, the meaning is passive. Examples:
  ("The made choice (the choice that had been made) turned out to be not so great.")
  ("Broken glass is dangerous.")
 For unaccusative intransitive verbs, the meaning is active. Examples:
  ("The fallen man could not get back up again.")
  ("Everyone went looking for the dog that had disappeared.")
 For unergative intransitive verbs, the past participle cannot be used as an adjective at all.

Like present participles, past participles can be preceded by an adverb.
  ("Hastily-made choices often lead to problems later.")
  ("I prefer freshly-made orange juice.")
  ("Learned young is done old.", a proverb)

Infinitive

Verb phrases
The infinitive can be used in larger verb phrases with an auxiliary verb or modal verb, much as in English. Like present participles, the infinitive can be accompanied by an object or adverb.

 ("I can see the car")

Verbal noun
The infinitive, when used as a noun, is neuter and has no plural.

  – ‘The killing of people is forbidden’, or less literally ‘Killing people is forbidden’.
  – ‘I hate waiting.’

In the past, the infinitive was inflected for the dative and genitive. There are a few remnants of the latter, e.g. in:

  – ‘See you!’
 . – ‘A distance that can be walked in one hour.’

It also occurs in expressions involving  (until ... resulted):

  – ‘He was beaten until bleeding resulted.’

Impersonal imperative
The infinitive is also commonly used as a kind of impersonal or polite imperative (infinitivus pro imperativo). This often has a meaning much like the English “one must (not)…” or “please do (not)…” and can be used to soften a direct command into more of a strong request, or to make the command more general (e.g. on signs and in written instructions) rather than directed at the listener or reader at that specific moment in time. The distinction is not always clear, and often both the infinitive and the imperative may be used without a strong difference in meaning.

  ‘No smoking’ (or less literally ‘please refrain from smoking’), versus  ‘don't smoke!’.
  ‘Pay here’, alternatively .
  ‘Shake before use’.

With 
The infinitive is often preceded by the preposition , analogous to the phrase  + verb in English. It is used in combination with certain verbs like  ‘to begin’.

  ("He started to cough")

In combination with  ‘to be’ it can express a potentiality.

   ("That was to be expected").

The extended form can be used as an adjective:

  ("The crowd that is to be expected")

But it can still carry adverbial expressions or objects:

 ("The crowd that is be expected in that case").

Compound infinitives also exist for the perfect and the future, as well as for the passive voice of transitive verbs, and they can be used to form abridged dependent clauses.

 ("He promised that he would pay that")

Transitivity

Depending on meaning and use, Dutch verbs belong to one of a handful of transitivity classes:
 Unergative intransitive verbs do not take a grammatical object, and have active meaning (the subject is the agent). The perfect is formed with the auxiliary . They possess an impersonal passive voice.
 Unaccusative intransitive verbs do not take a grammatical object, and have passive or middle meaning (the subject is the patient or there is no clear agent). The perfect is formed with the auxiliary .
 Transitive verbs take a grammatical object. The subject is the agent, the object is either direct (patient) or indirect. The passive voice is formed with the auxiliary . The perfect is formed with the auxiliary  when the direct object becomes subject, and with the auxiliary  when the indirect object becomes subject.
 Ditransitive verbs take two grammatical objects, a direct object (patient) and an indirect object. These act like transitive verbs in most respects.
 Middle verbs, also called verbs of innocence, are essentially transitive unaccusative verbs, and take a grammatical object. The use of the perfect auxiliary  carries an implication that the subject is not the direct initiator of the action or cannot or does not want to be held responsible for it. This includes verbs such as  "to forget" and  "to lose (an object)".
 Reflexive verbs are accompanied by a reflexive pronoun as object
 Impersonal verbs only take an indefinite pronoun  (it) as subject
 Absolute verbs are similar to unergatives, but they lack an impersonal passive form

Verbs can belong to several classes at once, depending on use. Specifically, many transitive verbs can also be used intransitively, and are thus ambitransitive. For example,  "I eat an apple" contains a transitive verb, while  "I eat" contains an unergative intransitive verb. Most ditransitive verbs can also be used as monotransitives (with only one object, direct or indirect) or even intransitives.

Whether an intransitive use is unergative or unaccusative depends both on the verb and on the meaning in which it is used. Generally, most transitive verbs become unergatives when the object is removed; these are accusative verbs. But there is also a sizable number of so-called ergative verbs, which become unaccusative when there is no object. Consequently, these verbs switch from active to either passive or middle meaning when the object is dropped. Examples exist in both Dutch and English, such as the transitive  "I break the glass" versus unaccusative  "the glass breaks". In both cases, the glass is the patient, but in the first case it's the direct object while in the second it's the subject. The auxiliary  of such verbs is used for both passive and intransitive use, making those uses essentially indistinguishable. The phrase  can be interpreted as both "the glass has been broken" and "the glass is broken".

Alongside the normal conjugated verb forms, Dutch has a variety of verbal meanings that are expressed using auxiliary verbs or other additional words. The use of auxiliary verbs, particularly of the perfect tenses and the passive voice -if extant-, depends on the transitivity class of the verb.

Perfect, future and passive

The perfect indicates that an action is complete. In Dutch the completion can take place in present, past, present future or past future:

 ‘I ate’, literally ‘I have eaten’ – present perfect (with simple past meaning)
 ‘I had eaten’ or ‘I had been eating’ – past perfect (with pluperfect meaning)
 ‘I will have eaten’ – future perfect
 ‘I would have eaten’ – past conditional (either as future-in-the-past or conditional mood)

The future tenses all take the auxiliary verb , cognate with English .
The passive voice indicates that the subject undergoes the action rather than performing it itself. Both categories are formed with a variety of auxiliary verbs.

As can be seen in the table, in the case of unaccusative verbs, the auxiliary  cannot be used for the perfect, unlike in English. In general these are verbs that describe a process (e.g. to happen, melt, die) rather than an action. That means that there is no (clear) actor involved.

As in English, ergative verbs can occur both in a transitive (I break the glass) and in an unaccusative mode (the glass breaks). In Dutch the perfect of the latter takes  ‘to be’, so that  can either be seen as a perfect passive or as a perfect unaccusative. Dutch differs from German in that the latter language would add the participle  to the passive sentence: .

Unergatives in general do possess passive forms, but they are impersonal.  They typically take the adverb  as a dummy subject and are hard to translate directly into English.  means something like ‘There’s barking going on’ or ‘There’s some dog barking’. Impersonal constructions of this kind are quite common in the language. The passives of transitive verbs can also be given an impersonal flavor by adding the dummy adverb , provided the subject is indefinite, e.g.  ‘There are boxes being opened’ or ‘Boxes are being opened’.

Verbs of motion like  ‘to walk’,  ‘to swim’,  ‘to ride, drive’ typically occur as unaccusative / unergative pairs.
directional
 – ‘I am walking home’
 – ‘I walked home’
non-directional
 – ‘I walk a lot’
 – ‘I walked a lot’
 – ‘There is a lot of walking going on’
Note also that the meanings of the formations that use  correspond to the meaning of the past participle when used as an adjective. Thus, unergative verbs can never use  as the auxiliary as their past participles cannot be used as adjectives. Furthermore, for ergative verbs, the passive does not differ significantly in meaning from the regular intransitive present tense. This is also true of English: a glass that  is a glass that .

The forms listed above can occur in both present and past tense. The table lists the present tense forms, while the past tense is formed by conjugating the auxiliary verb in the past tense. Thus, this creates  ‘I had opened the box.’ and so on.

When the perfect is created from a phrase that already uses an auxiliary verb, the auxiliary gets used in the infinitive form, rather than the past participle. Some auxiliary verbs even have no past participle due to this. For example:
  ‘I will come tomorrow.’ →  ‘I had been going to come tomorrow.’
  ‘He has to close the door.’ →  ‘He has had to close the door.’

Ditransitive verbs
Ditransitive verbs carry both a direct and an indirect object. In English both objects can become the subject of a passive construction and the same auxiliary is used to form it:

I give the man a book
The man is given a book by me
A book is given to the man by me.

In Dutch a verb like  (to donate) follows a similar pattern but the auxiliary  (to get) is used for the pseudo-passive construction that renders the indirect object into the subject, whereas  is used for passive involving the direct object:

Ik schenk de man een boek
De man krijgt van mij een boek geschonken
Een boek wordt door mij aan de man geschonken.

The following three groups of verbs only take the auxiliary  in the perfect tenses.

Impersonal verbs
Impersonal verbs have no true subject, but use a dummy subject pronoun  ("it"). These verbs often refer to conditions, such as the weather:
  ("It rains." or "It is raining.")
  ("A thunderstorm is happening.")

Reflexive verbs
This contrasts with e.g. French, where être (to be) is used as perfect auxiliary.

Ik vergiste me  (I mistook, made an error)
Ik heb me vergist

Some of these occur in pairs with a transitive form, replacing the unaccusative component of an ergative.

Ratten verspreiden de ziekte – -(Rats spread the disease)
De ziekte verspreidt zich – (The disease is spreading)

There are no verbs that only occur in a reciprocal form, but those that can take the reciprocal pronoun  (each other) also take  in the perfect, thus behaving like reflexive ones.

Massa's trekken elkaar aan. – (Masses attract each other.)
De magneten hadden elkaar aangetrokken – (The magnets had attracted each other).

Absolute verbs
These verbs resemble the unergative ones, except that they do not possess an impersonal passive.

De zon schijnt – (The sun shines)
 *Er wordt geschenen <- does not exist ->

Some of them may carry a direct object, but they have neither a personal, nor an impersonal passive:

Een jas aanhebben – (To wear a coat)
 *Een jas wordt aangehad <- does not exist ->

Similarly the past participle cannot be used as adjective:

 *De aangehadde jas <- does not exist ->

Future

Although the present tense can be used to indicate future events, there is also a more explicit future tense in Dutch. It is formed using the auxiliary  ("will, shall, be going to"), which can be conjugated in both present and past tense. The "past future" carries a sense having pledged or promised to do something, or having been expected to do it, much as "was/were going to" does in English.

  ("I will do it tomorrow." or "I am going to do it tomorrow.")
  ("You were going to clean the windows yesterday!")

An alternative future tense is formed using  ("to go") as the auxiliary. It is used in its literal meaning to indicate that one is moving to a place to perform an action, or is intending to do so ("be going to go"). More generally, it can indicate any kind of intention or plan to perform the action. It can also imply the start of an action in the future.

  ("I'm going to go shopping with my friends tomorrow.")
  ("For today the work is done; tomorrow they're going to continue working.")
  ("It's going to start raining hard in a moment.")

Conditional

It is therefore somewhat analogous to the use of would in English, as the past tense of the future auxiliary will. The conditional is identical in form to the "past future" described above, but is always accompanied by some kind of condition that the verb depends on, usually introduced with conjunctions like  ("if").

  ("I would not do that if I were you.")
  ("He would not have cleaned the windows, if they were not dirty.")

Progressive

The progressive aspect indicates that an action is ongoing and in progress. It is formed using  +  + infinitive of action verb. It is equivalent to the English ‘be …-ing’ or ‘be in the middle of …-ing’, but is not used as often.

  ‘You'll have to wait (a while), I am eating now.’
  ‘He was cleaning the windows when the phone rang.’

Unlike in English, the progressive cannot be combined with the perfect to make a hypothetical "perfect progressive". Both "I have been eating" and "I had been eating" are expressed using the simple past tense form of the progressive: 

A similar expression is  +  + infinitive of action verb or  + action noun.

  ‘He’s (busy) repairing the clock’.
 Or:  ‘Idem’.
  ‘You’re spending the whole day helping that child.’ (notice the superfluous  which is colloquial).

A different way to render progressive aspect is to use the (static) verbs  ‘to sit’,  ‘to walk’,  ‘to stand’ and  ‘to lie’ with  + infinitive. These verbs, when in the perfect, all use a double infinitive.
   – ‘I’m sat down eating’ (UK) or ‘I’m sitting here eating’ (North America).
  – ‘I’m stood (here) cleaning windows’ (UK) or ‘I’m standing here cleaning windows’ (North America).
   – ‘Jantje is sleeping’.

The literal meaning of the verbs to sit or to stand etc. is often secondary to their durative aspect.

Numerals
Dutch uses a decimal numeral system. Numerals are not inflected.

0–9
The numbers from 0 to 9 are:

Note that  is the same word as the indefinite article in the written language.

10–19

The numbers 10, 11 and 12 are irregular. 13 to 19 are formed by adding  ("-teen") to the base number.

20–99

The decades 20 to 90 are formed by adding  ("-ty") to the base number.

No spaces are written between them, and a diaeresis is added when necessary. For example:

 28  ("eight and twenty")
 83  ("three and eighty")
 99  ("nine and ninety")

Hundreds

Multiples of 100 are expressed by placing the multiple before , without any spaces: 200 , 300  and so on. Sometimes multiples higher than 10 can be used as synonyms for the thousands, such as 1100 , 2500 .

Combinations of a hundred and a lower number are expressed by just placing them together, with the hundred coming first. Sometimes,  is added in between, but this is optional and not commonly done nowadays.

 112  or 
 698 
 1258

Thousands

Unlike in English, this is not preceded by an article. The same system used for naming the hundreds applies to the thousands as well, so multiples of 1000 are expressed by writing the multiple right before: 2000 , 3000 , 20000 , 999000 .

Combinations of a thousand and a lower number are expressed by placing them together, with the thousand coming first. A space is written between them.

 1 258 
 9 001 
 32 348 
 123 456

Millions and above

Dutch always uses the long scale system.

 1 000 000 
 1 000 000 000 
 1 000 000 000 000 
 1 000 000 000 000 000 
 etc.

Multiples of any of these are similar to the thousands, but a space is written between the multiple and the "million": 2 000 000 , 420 000 000 000 . If the multiple is 1, it must also be present, unlike with the thousands where it is left out: 1 000 000 .

Combinations with lower numbers are much the same as with the thousands.

 117 401 067 
 10 987 654 321

Ordinal numbers

Ordinal numbers behave and inflect like superlative adjectives. Unlike normal adjectives, they always appear in the inflected form; always ending in  ignoring whether the following noun is neuter or not, and are usually preceded by a definite article of some kind.

Which one is added depends on the word. The numbers 1 and 3 have irregular ordinals.

When a number is composed of multiple parts, the ending is added only to the last part of the word, and follows the rules for that word. Thus, 21st , 409th , 9001st .

Fractional numbers

Fractional numbers are expressed using a cardinal number for the numerator, and an ordinal for the denominator, like in English.
 1/5 
 3/8 
In 3/4, the space is often left out: .

The word  can be left out if the numerator is not 1.
 9 3/4 
 5 1/6 
 3 1/2 

Iterative numbers

These express repetition, like "once" or "five times".
  ("two times, twice")
  ("nine times")
  ("a hundred times")

There are also ordinal forms of these, which express an iteration within a sequence of repetitions. They are formed with an ordinal instead of a cardinal, and act as masculine nouns.
  ("the first time")
  ("the thirtieth time")

Multiplicative numbers

These express a multiple of something. They are formed with the suffix  ‘-fold’ and are neuter nouns.
  ‘a twofold, multiple of two’
  ‘a threefold, multiple of three’
  ‘a hundredfold, multiple of hundred’
The "regular" form  instead means ‘simpleness, uncomplicatedness, ease’.

Adjectives are formed by adding  to this, giving the combination .
  ‘double, twofold’
  ‘triple, threefold’
  ‘hundredfold’
Again,  ‘single, simple, onefold’ is used for 1, and  means ‘simple, uncomplicated, easy’. Alternatively, the word  ‘single’ can be used alone.

Notes

See also
Dutch declension
Dutch conjugation
DT-Manie
Dutch Wikipedia on hen and hun

References 
Aarts, Florent G.A.M. & Herman Wekker. A Contrastive Grammar of English and Dutch. Leiden: Martinus Nijhoff, 1987.
Audring, Jenny. “Pronominal Gender in Spoken Dutch”, Journal of Germanic Linguistics 18, no. 2 (2006): 85–116.
Donaldson, Bruce. Dutch: A Comprehensive Grammar, 2nd edn. Abingdon-on-Thames: Routledge, 2008.
Fehringer, Carol. A Reference Grammar of Dutch. Cambridge: Cambridge University Press, 1999.
Oosterhoff, Jenneke. Modern Dutch Grammar: A Practical Guide. Abingdon-on-Thames: Routledge, 2015.
Spaans, Yolande. A Practical Dutch Grammar, 3rd unrevised edn. Leiden: Primavera Pers, 2013.
van Riemsdijk, Henk. A Case Study in Syntactic Markedness: The Binding Nature of Prepositional Phrases. Dordrecht: Foris, 1978.
van Riemsdijk, Henk, ed. Clitics in the Languages of Europe. Berlin: Mouton de Gruyter, 1999.

External links
Algemene Nederlandse Spraakkunst, a comprehensive grammar of Dutch which is viewable online (in Dutch)
 E-ANS: de elektronische ANS: electronic version of the second, revised edition of the Algemene Nederlandse Spraakkunst (ANS) from 1997.
The Dutch Learner's Grammar (The University of Sheffield)
Beginning Learner's Grammar of Dutch (UCL)
Advanced Learner's Grammar of Dutch (UCL)
www.dutchgrammar.com
Dutch Flashcards